Re Rica Gold Washing Co (1879) 11 Ch D 36 is a UK insolvency law case concerning the liquidation when a company is unable to repay its debts. It held that a shareholder, to having standing to bring a winding up petition must have a sufficient tangible interest in what is left over after winding up.

Facts
A member of the company wished to petition to wind up the company, a gold mining operation in "Colombia". He held 75 fully paid up £1 shares.

Hall VC dismissed the petition, holding that his interest was not sufficient.

Judgment
Sir George Jessel MR said for a fully paid up shareholder, ‘it must be that after full payment of all the debts and liabilities of the company there will remain a surplus divisible among the shareholders of sufficient value to authorise him to present a petition.’ This shareholder, with 75 paid up £1 shares, did not have sufficient tangible interest. His judgment went as follows.

Brett LJ and Bramwell LJ concurred.

See also

UK insolvency law

Notes

References
L Sealy and S Worthington, Cases and Materials in Company Law (9th edn OUP 2010)
R Goode, Principles of Corporate Insolvency Law (4th edn Sweet & Maxwell 2011)

United Kingdom insolvency case law
Court of Appeal (England and Wales) cases
1879 in British law
1879 in case law